Gakkō no Kaidan (literally School Ghost Stories) may refer to:

 Gakkō no Kaidan (novel series), a series of Japanese light novels by Takaaki Kaima
 Gakkō no Kaidan (film), a series of Japanese horror movies based on the books by Toru Tsunemitsu
 Ghost Stories (anime), a series of anime episodes
 Gakkō no Kaidan (2015 TV series), a series of Japanese drama starring Suzu Hirose

See also
 Kaidan (parapsychology), ghost or horror story